Vasu Sangsingkeo (also known as Jib Ror.Dor., Nickname: Jeep; born December 29, 1967) is a Thai actor, host and singer.

History 
Vasu Sangsingkeo (Nickname Jeep) born December 29, 1967, son of Vitoon Sangsingkeo and Sudacha Sangsingkeo Graduate from Kasetsart University Laboratory School, Triam Udom Suksa School and Chulalongkorn University.

Works

Host 

 Return Politic Thailand (2013–2014)
 Quote of Sufficiently (2012)
 New 5 Page 1 (2012)
 Reform Thailand (2011)
 Teen superstar (2011)
 Station help flood (2011)
 Sound Track in Married of Prince William & Kate (2011)
 Hot talk by Vasu (2009–2010)
 Parliament around the world (2008)

Music 
 Jib Ror.Dor. (1986)

Music Video 
 Oye oye (1988)

Honours 
  2009 – Order of the Crown of Thailand

References 

Vasu Sangsingkeo
Living people
1967 births
Thai television personalities
Vasu Sangsingkeo
Place of birth missing (living people)